Ariel Carreño (born 4 March 1979 in Córdoba) is an Argentine former footballer who played as a striker, last for San Miguel.

Carreño is a product of the Boca Juniors youth system, he made his debut for the first team in 1998, he played a total of 44 games for the club in all competitions, scoring 8 goals. He helped Boca to win the Apertura 1998 and the Copa Sudamericana 2004.

Carreño had a spell in Mexico with Puebla F.C. and a season in Switzerland with FC Thun. He has also played for a number of Argentine clubs including Chacarita Juniors, Nueva Chicago, San Lorenzo, Club Atlético Lanús, Tiro Federal and San Martín (SJ).

Titles

External links
 BDFA profile
Football-lineups player profile

1979 births
Living people
Footballers from Córdoba, Argentina
Argentine footballers
Association football forwards
Boca Juniors footballers
Chacarita Juniors footballers
Nueva Chicago footballers
San Lorenzo de Almagro footballers
Club Atlético Lanús footballers
Tiro Federal footballers
FC Thun players
San Martín de San Juan footballers
Millonarios F.C. players
Once Caldas footballers
La Equidad footballers
Centro Atlético Fénix players
Argentine Primera División players
Categoría Primera A players
Swiss Super League players
Argentine expatriate footballers
Expatriate footballers in Colombia
Expatriate footballers in Mexico
Expatriate footballers in Switzerland
Argentine expatriate sportspeople in Mexico
Argentine expatriate sportspeople in Switzerland
Argentine expatriate sportspeople in Colombia